The women's +67 kg  competition in taekwondo at the 2008 Summer Olympics in Beijing took place on 23 August at the Beijing Science and Technology University Gymnasium.

Competition format
The main bracket consisted of a single elimination tournament, culminating in the gold medal match. Two bronze medals were awarded at the taekwondo competitions. A repechage was used to determine the bronze medal winners. Every competitor who lost to one of the two finalists competed in the repechage, another single-elimination competition. Each semifinal loser faced the last remaining repechage competitor from the opposite half of the bracket in a bronze medal match.

Controversy
The quarterfinal match between Sarah Stevenson of Great Britain and China's Chen Zhong on August 23 was plagued by controversy. Chen Zhong had led 1-0 through most of the match but 4 seconds before the end, Stevenson landed a clear strike to the face of her opponent. However, only half the judges recorded the hit which was thus not registered, dashing Stevenson's olympic hopes of gaining her the two points that would have secured her a quick victory. Stevenson's coach was furious and protested to the referee and judges, but initially Zhong was awarded the match. The British team protested for over an hour and on seeing the clear video footage of the strike to the face, unprecedently in the sport of Taekwondo, the judges decision was repealed and it was Stevenson who went through to the semi-finals against María del Rosario Espinoza of Mexico. Espinoza however, with a disoriented crowd looking on at the loss of their Chinese gold medal hope, secured a clear victory over Stevenson and went on to win gold, whilst Stevenson took bronze in the bronze medal match against the Egyptian Noha Abd Rabo.

On announcing the change of result in the quarter final, the tournament director said: 
"The competition supervisory board has looked into this matter deeply, has made video analysis which has been open to all the referees and judges.  In applying paragraph two of page 64 of the competition rules of the World Taekwondo Federation we have to change this result and we have to declare the British player as winner.  We are very sorry to the spectators of China but justice is first. Thank you for understanding."

Schedule
All times are China standard time (UTC+8)

Qualifying Athletes

Results
Legend
PTG — Won by points gap
SUP — Won by superiority
OT — Won on over time (Golden Point)

Main bracket

Repechage

References

Taekwondo at the 2008 Summer Olympics
Olymp
Women's events at the 2008 Summer Olympics